James or Jimmy Gemmell may refer to:

Jimmy Gemmell (1880-unknown), Scottish footballer for Sunderland, Stoke and Leeds City
Jimmy Gemmell (footballer, born 1911) (1911–1992), English footballer for Bury and Southport
James Gemmell (b. 1980), Canadian ice sledge hockey player

See also
James Fairlie Gemmill